The Pharaohs' Woman is a 1960 Italian historical drama film directed by Victor Tourjansky and starring John Drew Barrymore.  The film is set in Ancient Egypt during the 31st century BCE (shortly after the unification of Upper and Lower Egypt) and pertains to a love story set against the backdrop of a power struggle between a prince of the former ruling dynasty of Lower Egypt and the new overlords from Upper Egypt. It was the first feature film shot in Techniscope.

Plot
Ramses, prince of Thebes and Pharaoh of Upper Egypt, is in dispute with his cousin Sabaku, prince of Bubasti and Pharaoh of Lower Egypt. The noble Amosis, in an attempt to reconcile them, takes them on a cruise on the Nile, but the three, during a game of dice, meet Akis, whom they are fascinated by. The game of dice therefore has the girl as its stake, and is won by Ramses, but bad luck wants Akis to be guarded by Farka, Ramses' servant and friend of Amosis, who then entrusts the young woman to the priestess of the temple of Bubastis. However, she is discovered and denounced by Mareth, a jealous lady from Sabaku. A series of events will force the young Akis to plan her revenge, and the destruction of the couple ...

Cast

 Linda Cristal as Akis 

 Pierre Brice as Amosis the Physician 

 John Drew Barrymore as Sabaku, Prince of Bubastis 

 Armando Francioli as Ramses, Prince of Thebes  

 Lilli Lembo as Mareth 

 Nerio Bernardi

 Guido Celano

 Enzo Fiermonte

See also

 List of historical drama films

References

External links

 

Fiction set in the 4th millennium BC

31st century BC

Films set in ancient Egypt

1960 films

Peplum films

1960s historical films

Films directed by Victor Tourjansky

Films scored by Giovanni Fusco
Sword and sandal films
1960s Italian-language films
1960s Italian films